These drugs are known in the UK as controlled drugs, because this is the term by which the act itself refers to them. In more general terms, however, many of these drugs are also controlled by the Medicines Act 1968, there are many other drugs which are controlled by the Medicines Act but not by the Misuse of Drugs Act, and some other drugs (alcohol, for example) are controlled by other laws. 

The Misuse of Drugs Act sets out three separate categories, Class A, Class B, and Class C. Class A drugs represent those deemed most dangerous, and so carry the harshest punishments. Class C represents those thought to have the least capacity for harm, and so the Act demands more lenient punishment. In reality the potential harm has little bearing on the class, which has led to dissatisfaction with drug laws.

Being found in possession of a drug on this list is dealt with less seriously than would be if it were deemed that there is intent to supply (even without payment) the drug to others. Possession with intent to supply carries a maximum penalty of life imprisonment.

With regard to lawful possession and supply, a different set of categories apply which are set out in the Misuse of Drugs Regulations 2001 (as amended). This sets out five schedules each with their own restrictions. Schedule 1 contains substances considered by the government to have no medicinal value, such as hallucinogens, and their use is limited primarily to research, whereas schedules 2–5 contain the other regulated drugs. This means that although drugs may fall into the category of Class A/B/C, they may also fall into one of the schedules for legitimate medicinal use. For example, morphine is a Class A drug under the Misuse of Drugs Act 1971, but when lawfully supplied falls under the category of a Schedule 2 controlled drug.

Substances may be removed and added to different parts of the schedule by statutory instrument, provided a report of the Advisory Council on the Misuse of Drugs has been commissioned and has reached a conclusion, although the Secretary of State is not bound by the council's findings. This list has in practice been modified a great number of times, sometimes removing substances, but more commonly adding some; for example, many benzodiazepines became Class C drugs in 1985, and many cathinones became Class B drugs in 2010.

Class A drugs 
1. The following substances, namely:—

(a)

N.B. Sub-paragraphs (b) and (c) were added in 1977, sub-paragraphs (d) and (e) were added in 1986. Sub-paragraph (ba) was subsequently added in 2001.

(b) any compound (not being a compound for the time being specified in sub-paragraph (a) above) structurally derived from tryptamine or from a ring-hydroxy tryptamine by modification in any of the following ways, that is to say—

(i) by substitution at the nitrogen atom of the sidechain to any extent with alkyl or alkenyl substituents, or by inclusion of the nitrogen atom of the side chain (and no other atoms of the side chain) in a cyclic structure;
(ii) by substitution at the carbon atom adjacent to the nitrogen atom of the side chain with alkyl or alkenyl substituents;
(iii) by substitution in the 6-membered ring to any extent with alkyl, alkoxy, haloalkyl, thioalkyl, alkylenedioxy, or halide substituents;
(iv) by substitution at the 2-position of the tryptamine ring system with an alkyl substituent;

(ba)
the following phenethylamine derivatives, namely:—

 Allyl(a-methyl-3,4-methylenedioxyphenethyl)amine
 2-Amino-1-(2,5-dimethoxy-4-methylphenyl)ethanol
 2-Amino-1-(3,4-dimethoxyphenyl)ethanol
 Benzyl(a-methyl-3,4-methylenedioxyphenethyl)amine
 4-Bromo-b,2,5-trimethoxyphenethylamine
 N-(4-sec-Butylthio-2,5-dimethoxyphenethyl)hydroxylamine
 Cyclopropylmethyl(a-methyl-3,4-methylenedioxyphenethyl)amine
 2-(4,7-Dimethoxy-2,3-dihydro-1H-indan-5-yl)ethylamine
 2-(4,7-Dimethoxy-2,3-dihydro-1H-indan-5-yl)-1-methylethylamine
 2-(2,5-Dimethoxy-4-methylphenyl)cyclopropylamine
 2-(1,4-Dimethoxy-2-naphthyl)ethylamine
 2-(1,4-Dimethoxy-2-naphthyl)-1-methylethylamine
 N-(2,5-Dimethoxy-4-propylthiophenethyl)hydroxylamine
 2-(1,4-Dimethoxy-5,6,7,8-tetrahydro-2-naphthyl)ethylamine
 2-(1,4-Dimethoxy-5,6,7,8-tetrahydro-2-naphthyl)-1-methylethylamine
 a,a-Dimethyl-3,4-methylenedioxyphenethylamine
 a,a-Dimethyl-3,4-methylenedioxyphenethyl(methyl)amine
 Dimethyl(a-methyl-3,4-methylenedioxyphenethyl)amine
 N-(4-Ethylthio-2,5-dimethoxyphenethyl)hydroxylamine
 4-Iodo-2,5-dimethoxy-a-methylphenethyl(dimethyl)amine
 2-(1,4-Methano-5,8-dimethoxy-1,2,3,4-tetrahydro-6-naphthyl)ethylamine
 2-(1,4-Methano-5,8-dimethoxy-1,2,3,4-tetrahydro-6-naphthyl)-1-methylethylamine
 2-(5-Methoxy-2,2-dimethyl-2,3-dihydrobenzo[b]furan-6-yl)-1-methylethylamine
 2-Methoxyethyl(a-methyl-3,4-methylenedioxyphenethyl)amine
 2-(5-Methoxy-2-methyl-2,3-dihydrobenzo[b]furan-6-yl)-1-methylethylamine
 b-Methoxy-3,4-methylenedioxyphenethylamine
 1-(3,4-Methylenedioxybenzyl)butyl(ethyl)amine
 1-(3,4-Methylenedioxybenzyl)butyl(methyl)amine
 2-(a-Methyl-3,4-methylenedioxyphenethylamino)ethanol
 a-Methyl-3,4-methylenedioxyphenethyl(prop-2-ynyl)amine
 N-Methyl-N-(a-methyl-3,4-methylenedioxyphenethyl)hydroxylamine
 O-Methyl-N-(a-methyl-3,4-methylenedioxyphenethyl)hydroxylamine
 a-Methyl-4-(methylthio)phenethylamine
 b,3,4,5-Tetramethoxyphenethylamine
 b,2,5-Trimethoxy-4-methylphenethylamine

(c) any compound (not being methoxyphenamine or a compound for the time being specified in sub-paragraph (a) above) structurally derived from phenethylamine an N-alkylphenethylamine, a methylphenethylamine, an N-alkyl-α-methylphenethylamine, an ethylphenethylamine, or an N-alkyl-α-ethylphenethylamine by substitution in the ring to any extent with alkyl, alkoxy, alkylenedioxy or halide substituents, whether or not further substituted in the ring by one or more other univalent substituents.

(d) any compound (not being a compound for the time being specified in sub-paragraph (a) above) structurally derived from fentanyl by modification in any of the following ways, that is to say,

(i) by replacement of the phenyl portion of the phenethyl group by any heteromonocycle whether or not further substituted in the heterocycle;

(ii) by substitution in the phenethyl group with alkyl, alkenyl, alkoxy, hydroxy, halogeno, haloalkyl, amino or nitro groups;

(iii) by substitution in the piperidine ring with alkyl or alkenyl groups;

(iv) by substitution in the aniline ring with alkyl, alkoxy, alkylenedioxy, halogeno or haloalkyl groups;

(v) by substitution at the 4-position of the piperidine ring with any alkoxycarbonyl or alkoxyalkyl or acyloxy group;

(vi) by replacement of the N-propionyl group by another acyl group;

(e) any compound (not being a compound for the time being specified in sub-paragraph (a) above) structurally derived from pethidine by modification in any of the following ways, that is to say,

(i) by replacement of the 1-methyl group by an acyl, alkyl whether or not unsaturated, benzyl or phenethyl group, whether or not further substituted;

(ii) by substitution in the piperidine ring with alkyl or alkenyl groups or with a propano bridge, whether or not further substituted;

(iii) by substitution in the 4-phenyl ring with alkyl, alkoxy, aryloxy, halogeno or haloalkyl groups;

(iv) by replacement of the 4-ethoxycarbonyl by any other alkoxycarbonyl or any alkoxyalkyl or acyloxy group;

(v) by formation of an N-oxide or of a quaternary base.

(f) any compound (not being benzyl(α-methyl-3,4-methylenedioxyphenethyl)amine) structurally derived from mescaline, 4-bromo-2,5-dimethoxy-α-methylphenethylamine, 2,5-dimethoxy-α,4-dimethylphenethylamine, N-hydroxytenamphetamine (N-hydroxy-MDA), or a compound specified in sub-paragraph (ba) or (c) above, by substitution at the nitrogen atom of the amino group with a benzyl substituent, whether or not substituted in the phenyl ring of the benzyl group to any extent.”.

2. Any stereoisomeric form of a substance for the time being specified in paragraph 1 above not being dextromethorphan or dextrorphan.

3. Any ester or ether of a substance for the time being specified in paragraph 1 or 2 above [not being a substance for the time being specified in Part II of this Schedule].

4. Any salt of a substance for the time being specified in any of paragraphs 1 to 3 above.

5. Any preparation or other product containing a substance or product for the time being specified in any of paragraphs 1 to 4 above.

6. Any preparation designed for administration by injection which includes a substance or product for the time being specified in any of paragraphs 1 to 3 of Part II of this Schedule.

Class B drugs 
1. The following substances, namely:—

(a)

(aa) Any compound (not being bupropion, cathinone, diethylpropion, pyrovalerone or a compound for the time being specified in sub–paragraph (a) above) structurally derived from 2–amino–1–phenyl–1–propanone by modification in any of the following ways, that is to say,
(i) by substitution in the phenyl ring to any extent with alkyl, alkoxy, alkylenedioxy, haloalkyl or halide substituents, whether or not further substituted in the phenyl ring by one or more other univalent substituents;
(ii) by substitution at the 3–position with an alkyl substituent;
(iii) by substitution at the nitrogen atom with alkyl or dialkyl groups, or by inclusion of the nitrogen atom in a cyclic structure

(ab)
Any compound structurally derived from 2–aminopropan–1–one by substitution at the 1-position with any monocyclic, or fused‑polycyclic ring system (not being a phenyl ring or alkylenedioxyphenyl ring system), whether or not the compound is further modified in any of the following ways, that is to say,

(i) by substitution in the ring system to any extent with alkyl, alkoxy, haloalkyl or halide substituents, whether or not further substituted in the ring system by one or more other univalent substituents;

(ii) by substitution at the 3–position with an alkyl substituent;

(iii) by substitution at the 2‑amino nitrogen atom with alkyl or dialkyl groups, or by inclusion of the 2‑amino nitrogen atom in a cyclic structure

(b)
any 5,5 disubstituted barbituric acid

(c)
[2,3–Dihydro–5–methyl–3–(4–morpholinylmethyl)pyrrolo[1, 2, 3–de]–1,4–benzoxazin–6–yl]–1–naphthalenylmethanone. (WIN 55,212-2)

3–Dimethylheptyl–11–hydroxyhexahydrocannabinol.

[9–Hydroxy–6–methyl–3–[5–phenylpentan–2–yl] oxy–5, 6, 6a, 7, 8, 9, 10, 10a–octahydrophenanthridin–1–yl] acetate.

9-(Hydroxymethyl)–6, 6–dimethyl–3–(2–methyloctan–2–yl)–6a, 7, 10, 10a–tetrahydrobenzo[c]chromen–1–ol.

[2,3–Dihydro–5–methyl–3–(4–morpholinylmethyl)pyrrolo[1, 2, 3–de]–1,4–benzoxazin–6–yl]–1–naphthalenylmethanone.

Any compound structurally derived from 3–(1–naphthoyl)indole or 1H–indol–3–yl–(1–naphthyl)methane by substitution at the nitrogen atom of the indole ring by alkyl, alkenyl, cycloalkylmethyl, cycloalkylethyl or 2–(4–morpholinyl)ethyl, whether or not further substituted in the indole ring to any extent and whether or not substituted in the naphthyl ring to any extent.

Any compound structurally derived from 3–(1–naphthoyl)pyrrole by substitution at the nitrogen atom of the pyrrole ring by alkyl, alkenyl, cycloalkylmethyl, cycloalkylethyl or 2–(4–morpholinyl)ethyl, whether or not further substituted in the pyrrole ring to any extent and whether or not substituted in the naphthyl ring to any extent.

Any compound structurally derived from 1–(1–naphthylmethyl)indene by substitution at the 3–position of the indene ring by alkyl, alkenyl, cycloalkylmethyl, cycloalkylethyl or 2–(4–morpholinyl)ethyl, whether or not further substituted in the indene ring to any extent and whether or not substituted in the naphthyl ring to any extent.

Nabilone

Any compound structurally derived from 3–phenylacetylindole by substitution at the nitrogen atom of the indole ring with alkyl, alkenyl, cycloalkylmethyl, cycloalkylethyl or 2–(4–morpholinyl)ethyl, whether or not further substituted in the indole ring to any extent and whether or not substituted in the phenyl ring to any extent.

Any compound structurally derived from 2–(3–hydroxycyclohexyl)phenol by substitution at the 5–position of the phenolic ring by alkyl, alkenyl, cycloalkylmethyl, cycloalkylethyl or 2–(4–morpholinyl)ethyl, whether or not further substituted in the cyclohexyl ring to any extent.";

Any compound structurally derived from 3-benzoylindole by substitution at the nitrogen atom of the indole ring by alkyl, haloalkyl, alkenyl, cyanoalkyl, hydroxyalkyl, cycloalkylmethyl, cycloalkylethyl, (N-methylpiperidin-2-yl)methyl or 2–(4–morpholinyl)ethyl, whether or not further substituted in the indole ring to any extent and whether or not substituted in the phenyl ring to any extent.

Any compound structurally derived from 3-(1-adamantoyl)indole or 3-(2-adamantoyl)indole by substitution at the nitrogen atom of the indole ring by alkyl, haloalkyl, alkenyl, cyanoalkyl, hydroxyalkyl, cycloalkylmethyl, cycloalkylethyl, (N-methylpiperidin-2-yl)methyl or 2–(4–morpholinyl)ethyl, whether or not further substituted in the indole ring to any extent and whether or not substituted in the adamantyl ring to any extent.

Any compound structurally derived from 3-(2,2,3,3-tetramethylcyclopropylcarbonyl)indole by substitution at the nitrogen atom of the indole ring by alkyl, haloalkyl, alkenyl, cyanoalkyl, hydroxyalkyl, cycloalkylmethyl, cycloalkylethyl, (N-methylpiperidin-2-yl)methyl or 2–(4–morpholinyl)ethyl, whether or not further substituted in the indole ring to any extent.

(ca) any compound (not being clonitazene, etonitazene, acemetacin, atorvastatin, bazedoxifene, indometacin, losartan, olmesartan, proglumetacin, telmisartan, viminol, zafirlukast or a compound for the time being specified in sub-paragraph (c) above) structurally related to 1-pentyl-3-(1-naphthoyl)indole (JWH-018), in that the four sub-structures, that is to say the indole ring, the pentyl substituent, the methanone linking group and the naphthyl ring, are linked together in a similar manner, whether or not any of the sub-structures have been modified, and whether or not substituted in any of the linked sub-structures with one or more univalent substituents and, where any of the sub-structures have been modified, the modifications of the sub-structures are limited to any of the following, that is to say—

(i) replacement of the indole ring with indane, indene, indazole, pyrrole, pyrazole, imidazole, benzimidazole, pyrrolo[2,3-b]pyridine, pyrrolo[3,2-c]pyridine or pyrazolo[3,4‑b]pyridine;

(ii) replacement of the pentyl substituent with alkyl, alkenyl, benzyl, cycloalkylmethyl, cycloalkylethyl, (N-methylpiperidin-2-yl)methyl, 2-(4-morpholinyl)ethyl or (tetrahydropyran-4-yl)methyl;

(iii) replacement of the methanone linking group with an ethanone, carboxamide, carboxylate, methylene bridge or methine group;

(iv) replacement of the 1-naphthyl ring with 2-naphthyl, phenyl, benzyl, adamantyl, cycloalkyl, cycloalkylmethyl, cycloalkylethyl, bicyclo[2.2.1]heptanyl, 1,2,3,4-tetrahydronaphthyl, quinolinyl, isoquinolinyl, 1-amino-1-oxopropan-2-yl, 1‑hydroxy-1-oxopropan-2-yl, piperidinyl, morpholinyl, pyrrolidinyl, tetrahydropyranyl or piperazinyl.

(d) 1-Phenylcyclohexylamine or any compound (not being ketamine, tiletamine or a compound for the time being specified in paragraph 1(a) of Part 1 of this Schedule) structurally derived from 1-phenylcyclohexylamine or 2-amino-2-phenylcyclohexanone by modification in any of the following ways, that is to say,

(i) by substitution at the nitrogen atom to any extent by alkyl, alkenyl or hydroxyalkyl groups, or replacement of the amino group with a 1-piperidyl, 1-pyrrolidyl or 1-azepyl group, whether or not the nitrogen containing ring is further substituted by one or more alkyl groups;

(ii) by substitution in the phenyl ring to any extent by amino, alkyl, hydroxy, alkoxy or halide substituents, whether or not further substituted in the phenyl ring to any extent;

(iii) by substitution in the cyclohexyl or cyclohexanone ring by one or more alkyl substituents;

(iv) by replacement of the phenyl ring with a thienyl ring.

(e) Any compound (not being a compound for the time being specified in paragraph 1(ba) of Part 1 of this Schedule) structurally derived from 1-benzofuran, 2,3-dihydro-1-benzofuran, 1H-indole, indoline, 1H-indene, or indane by substitution in the 6-membered ring with a 2-ethylamino substituent whether or not further substituted in the ring system to any extent with alkyl, alkoxy, halide or haloalkyl substituents and whether or not substituted in the ethylamino side-chain with one or more alkyl substituents.

2.  Any stereoisomeric form of a substance for the time being specified in paragraph 1 of this Part of this Schedule.

3. Any salt of a substance for the time being specified in paragraph 1 or 2 of this Part of this Schedule.

4. Any preparation or other product containing a substance or product for the time being specified in any of paragraphs 1 to 3 of this Part of this Schedule, not being a preparation falling within paragraph 6 of Part I of this Schedule.

Class C drugs 
1. Class C drugs, supposedly the least harmful drugs, include the following substances:—

(a)

N.B. Sub-paragraphs (b), (c), (d) and (e) all refer to anabolic steroids that were banned in 1996 (unless referenced otherwise):

(b)

 4-Androstene-3,17-dione
 5-Androstene-3,17-diol
 Atamestane
 Bolandiol
 Bolasterone
 Bolazine
 Boldenone
 Bolenol
 Bolmantalate
 Calusterone
 4-Chloromethandienone
 Clostebol
 Desoxymethyltestosterone
 Dienedione
 Drostanolone
 Enestebol
 Epitiostanol
 Ethyloestrenol
 Fluoxymesterone
 Formebolone
 Furazabol
 Mebolazine
 Mepitiostane
 Mesabolone
 Mestanolone
 Mesterolone
 Methandienone
 Methandriol
 Methenolone
 Methyltestosterone
 Metribolone
 Mibolerone
 Nandrolone
 19-Nor-4-Androstene-3,17-dione
 19-Nor-5-Androstene-3,17-diol
 Norboletone
 Norclostebol
 Norethandrolone
 Ovandrotone
 Oxabolone
 Oxandrolone
 Oxymesterone
 Oxymetholone
 Prasterone
 Propetandrol
 Quinbolone
 Roxibolone
 Silandrone
 Stanolone
 Stanozolol
 Stenbolone
 Testosterone
 Thiomesterone
 Trenbolone

(c)
any compound (not being Trilostane or a compound for the time being specified in sub-paragraph (b) above) structurally derived from 17-hydroxyandrostan-3-one or from 17-hydroxyestran-3-one by modification in any of the following ways, that is to say,
(i) by further substitution at position 17 by a methyl or ethyl group;
(ii) by substitution to any extent at one or more of positions 1, 2, 4, 6, 7, 9, 11 or 16, but at no other position;
(iii) by unsaturation in the carbocyclic ring system to any extent, provided that there are no more than two ethylenic bonds in any one carbocyclic ring;
(iv) by fusion of ring A with a heterocyclic system;

(d)
any substance which is an ester or ether (or, where more than one hydroxyl function is available, both an ester and an ether) of a substance specified in sub-paragraph (b) or described in sub-paragraph (c) above;

(e)
 Chorionic gonadotropin
 Clenbuterol
 Non-human chorionic gonadotrophin
 Somatotropin
 Somatrem
 Somatropin

(f)
1–benzylpiperazine or any compound (not being 1–(3–chlorophenyl)piperazine or 1–(3–chlorophenyl)–4–(3–chloropropyl)piperazine) structurally derived from 1–benzylpiperazine or 1–phenylpiperazine by modification in any of the following ways

(i)
by substitution at the second nitrogen atom of the piperazine ring with alkyl, benzyl, haloalkyl or phenyl groups;

(ii)
by substitution in the aromatic ring to any extent with alkyl, alkoxy, alkylenedioxy, halide or haloalkyl groups;

2. Any stereoisomeric form of a substance for the time being specified in paragraph 1 of this Part of this Schedule [not being phenylpropanolamine.]

3.  Any salt of a substance for the time being specified in paragraph 1 or 2 of this Part of this Schedule.

4. Any preparation or other product containing a substance for the time being specified in any of paragraphs 1 to 3 of this Part of this Schedule.

Derivatives and analogues 
The act contains several references to "derivatives" of compounds but the extent of this term is not fully clarified. Where unspecified it is thought to indicate derivatives which can be made from the specified compound in a single synthetic step, although such a definition would indicate that alkyllysergamide analogues would be uncontrolled. Where the derivatives are specified to be "structural derivatives" there is precedent that the statute applies whenever the structure could be converted to the specified derivatives in any number of synthetic steps.

See also
 Cannabis in the United Kingdom
 Controlled Drug in the United Kingdom
 Drug policy of the United Kingdom
 Drug-related deaths in the United Kingdom

References

External links 
 The text of the Misuse of Drugs Act 1971 – Office of Public Sector Information
 Schedules and structures of the Misuse of Drugs Act 1971 – Isomer Design
 Misuse of Drugs Regulations 2001 as amended

United Kingdom law-related lists
Misuse of Drugs Act 1971
Drugs in the United Kingdom